Kumara is a populated area in the Mopti Region of Mali.

Geography
Latitude, longitude: 14.1167, -5.1500 (14° 7' N, 5° 9' W)
Altitude (feet): 823  
Altitude (meters): 250 
Time zone: UTC 0

Geography of Mali
Populated places in Mopti Region